The Organisation of Scottish Labour is a body established under the national rules of the UK Labour Party.

Timeline 

Origins and evolution of Scottish Labour

 In August 1888, after contesting the Mid Lanarkshire by-election, Keir Hardie co-founded with Liberal MP Robert Cunninghame-Graham the Scottish Labour Party (1888) with the support of the Scottish Miners' Federation, local trade unions, the Dundee Radical Association, the Scottish Home Rule Association, Crofters Party MPs, and the Scottish Land Restoration League.
 In December 1888, the Scottish Socialist Federation (SSF) was formed by members of the Social Democratic Federation.
 In August 1891, the Scottish United Trades Councils Labour Party (SUTCLP) was formed.
 In July 1892 general election, the SUTCLP gained support from the SSF.
 In January 1893, Keir Hardie and others formed the Independent Labour Party (ILP).
 In March 1893, the SUTCLP dissolved, advising members to join the ILP.
 In 1893, the Scottish Socialist Federation affiliated with the ILP.
 In 1894, the Scottish Labour Party of 1888 had by then made little impact and dissolved itself into the ILP.
 In March 1897, the Scottish Trades Union Congress (STUC) was formed in Glasgow, as a result of a political dispute with the TUC regarding political representation for the Labour movement.
 In 1899, the STUC with the ILP's Scottish branch formed the parliamentary campaign group Scottish Workers' Representation Committee (SWRC)
 In 1900, the ILP played a central role in the formation of the Labour Representation Committee (LRC) which was created by ILP Chairman Hardie's motion to create a single Labour parliamentary body that was passed at a special conference organised by the TUC. ILP nominee Ramsay MacDonald was elected as Secretary of the LRC.
 In 1906, the LRC is renamed the Labour Party, with the ILP becoming a Labour party affiliate and providing much of its activist base.
 In 1909, the SWRC was dissolved and merged with the Labour Party.
 In 1915, a subordinate Scottish Advisory Council (SAC) was formed by the Labour Party.
 In 1918, Scotland was formalised a "region" in the Labour party constitution and the SAC was renamed as the Scottish Council of the Labour Party
 In 1994, the Scottish Council of the Labour Party was renamed the Scottish Labour Party.
 In 2011, the Scottish Labour Party carried out a review of its organisation and elected its first ever overall leader (Johann Lamont).

Structure 

 UK Labour Party Head Office, London
 UK Labour Leader's Office
 UK National Executive Committee
 Scottish Labour Party Head Office, Glasgow
 Scottish Labour Leader's Office
 Scottish Executive Committee
 Affiliated STUC trade unions, socialist societies and the Co-operative Party
 Scottish Policy Forum
 Policy commissions & local policy forums
 Scottish Labour Conference
 Scottish Labour Press Office
 Labour Support Unit, Scottish Parliament
Constituency Labour Parties (CLP)
 Branch Labour Parties (BLP)

Scottish Executive Committee
The Scottish Executive Committee is the governing body of the Scottish Labour Party, responsible for administrative matters and strategic policy direction. The SEC officially meets every second month, with much of day-to-day party business and operations undertaken in groups and commissions. The SEC has three different membership sections – Constituency Labour Party (CLP) members, elected members and trade unions and affiliates. It is further split into the local government sub-committee and the constitution, fundraising and campaigns working groups.

Membership as of 2021:

Office Bearers
 Cara Hilton – Chair of the Scottish Labour Party
 Karen Whitefield – Vice-chair
 Cathy Peattie – Treasurer

Elected Members
 Anas Sarwar – Leader of the Scottish Labour Party
 Jackie Baillie – Deputy Leader of the Scottish Labour Party
 Ian Murray – Shadow Secretary of State for Scotland
 Maureen Devlin – Local Government
 David Ross – Local Government
 Meta Ramsay – Parliamentary Labour Party (PLP) Group Representative
 Jenny Marra – Scottish Parliament Group Representative
 Mark Griffin – Scottish Parliament Group Representative

Constituency Labour Party members
 Johanna Baxter – West of Scotland/Mid Scotland & Fife
 Cara Hilton – West of Scotland/Mid Scotland & Fife
 Lina Nass – North East Scotland/Highlands & Islands
 Marion Sporing – North East Scotland/Highlands & Islands
 Suzan King – Central Scotland/Glasgow
 James Adams – Central Scotland/Glasgow
 Scott Arthur – Lothians/South of Scotland
 Ann Henderson – Lothians/South of Scotland

Trade Union Section
 Drew Smith – GMB
 Cathy Murphy GMB
 Jackson Cullinane – Unite
 Siobhan McCready – Unite
 Simon Macfarlane – Unison
 Maggie Cook – Unison
 Jacqueline Martin – USDAW
 Karen Whitefield – USDAW
 Cathy Peattie – CWU
 John McCue – ASLEF

Scottish Labour Women's Committee

 Lorna Robertson
 Monique McAdams

Co-operative Party & Socialist Societies
 Ben Procter
 Katherine Sangster

Scottish Young Labour
 Coll Mcail
 Lauren Harper

Chairs of Scottish Labour

Scottish Policy Forum
The Scottish Policy Forum (SPF) is a body of the Scottish Labour Party responsible for developing a rolling policy programme on devolved matters. The Scottish Annual Conference approves policies of the SPF programme every year with the Scottish Executive Committee (in conjunction with a committee from the Scottish Parliament Labour Group) deciding which items of the programme are to be incorporated in Labour's manifesto for the Scottish Parliament elections. The SPF policy-making process is led by the 80 members elected from all sections of the party. The SPF establishes policy commissions to draw together policy discussion documents for consultation over three stages. The SPF is subordinate and feeds reports to the National Policy Forum.

General Secretary of the Scottish Labour Party
The General Secretary of the Scottish Labour Party, subordinate to the General Secretary of the Labour Party, is the administrative head and the most senior permanent staff member of the Scottish Labour Party. The General Secretary is responsible for running the party's organisation: legal affairs, staff management, campaigns, conferences, and liaising with the UK party. They also act as the Registered Treasurer, responsible for the party's financial accounts.

Staff
 Press Office
 Media Monitoring Unit
 Rebuttal Unit
 Regional press teams
 Research Unit (policy and constitutional issues)
 Administrative support
 Scottish Parliamentary Labour Support Unit (formerly SPLP Resource Unit)

Special Advisers to Donald Dewar

As Secretary of State for Scotland (1997–1999):

Wendy Alexander
Murray Elder
David Whitton

As First Minister (1999–2000):

John Rafferty – Chief of staff
Philip Chalmers – Head of the Scottish Executive's strategic communications unit  (previously director of polling and marketing for the Scottish Labour Party)
David Whitton
Brian Fitzpatrick
John MacLaren
 Professor Donald Maclennan
Neil Gillam
Chris Winslow

Scottish Parliament elections 
1999

Matthew Taylor – Election strategist
 Douglas Alexander – Election coordinator
Donald Dewar – Secretary of State for Scotland
Gordon Brown – Chancellor of the Exchequer
Brian Wilson – Minister of State for Scotland
John Reid – Minister of State for Transport
Alex Rowley – General Secretary
Lesley Quinn – Assistant General Secretary
Paul McKinney – Head of communications
David Whitton – Media adviser to Donald Dewar
Pat McFadden – Policy adviser to Donald Dewar
 John Rowan – Scottish Telephone Bank Organiser
 Hilary Perrin – Tours
 Bridget Sweeny – Visits
Ian Austin – Deputy director of communications
Ed Miliband – Rebuttal
 John Rafferty – Chief of staff to Donald Dewar
 Ann-Marie Whyte – Administration and office manager
 Kevin Reid and Suzanne Hilliard – Media monitoring
 Chris Winslow – Campaigner and parliamentary researcher to John Maxton MP
 Willie Sullivan – Development officer

2003

 Jack McConnell – Leader and First Minister of Scotland
 Jonathan Ashworth – Labour Party economics and welfare policy officer
 Gordon Brown – Chancellor of the Exchequer
Lesley Quinn – General Secretary

2007

Jack McConnell – Leader and First Minister of Scotland
John McTernan – Campaign coordinator
George Foulkes, Baron Foulkes of Cumnock – Campaign vice-chair
Tony Blair – Prime Minister
Gordon Brown – Chancellor of the Exchequer
Douglas Alexander – Secretary of State for Scotland
Lesley Quinn – General Secretary

2011

Iain Gray MSP – Leader
 Simon Pia – Spokesperson
 Michael Marra – Speechwriter
John Park MSP – Campaign coordinator
Tom Greatrex MP – Campaign strategist
 Kenny Young – Press Officer
Colin Smyth – General Secretary
 Rami Okasha – Head of communications
 Sarah Metcalfe – Head of research
 Adele Black – Diary secretary
 Pat Gordon – Assistant and election agent

2016

Kezia Dugdale MSP – Leader
Alex Rowley MSP – Deputy leader
James Kelly MSP – Campaign coordinator
Brian Roy – General Secretary

2021
Anas Sarwar MSP – Leader
Jackie Baillie MSP – Deputy leader
Kate Watson – Campaign coordinator
Drew Smith – Acting General Secretary

Party finance 
Donors

Brian Dempsey
Willie Haughey
 John Milligan

2010 general election expenditure: £968,000

References

External links
 Report of the Scottish Policy Forum – The Scottish Labour Party
 Ideas for a fairer Scotland – second stage consultation document

Books
 Hassan, Gerry (2004) (ed.) The Scottish Labour Party. Edinburgh University Press.

Scottish Labour
Scottish Labour Party